Jiangxichelys ( or ) is an extinct genus of nanhsiungchelyid turtle which existed in Ganzhou, Jiangxi Province, China during the latest Cretaceous epoch. It was first named by Haiyan Tong and Jinyou Mo in 2010 and the type species is Jiangxichelys ganzhouensis. It was an aquatic omnivore, as modern turtles are today.

References

Trionychia
Late Cretaceous turtles of Asia
Fossil taxa described in 2010
Prehistoric turtle genera
Extinct turtles